Russia, the largest country in the world, has international land borders with 14 sovereign states as well as 2 narrow maritime boundaries with the United States and Japan. There are also two breakaway states bordering Russia, namely Abkhazia and South Ossetia. The country has an internationally recognized land border running  in total, and has the second-longest land border of any country in the world, after China. The borders of the Russian Federation (formerly the Russian SFSR) were mostly drawn since 1956 (save for minor border changes, e.g., with China), and have remained the same after the dissolution of the Soviet Union. In 2014, Russia annexed Ukraine's Crimean peninsula in a move that remains internationally unrecognized.

As a transcontinental country in Eurasia, Russia shares borders in both Europe and Asia. Out of the 18 total land borders and maritime boundaries, 12 are in Europe and 5 are in Asia, while 1 border lies in the Bering Strait; between North America and Asia.

Overview
Russia shares borders with more countries than any other state in the world, owing to its large expanse.

Internationally recognized

Partially recognized

Border details
Below is a list of subjects with both neighbouring regions of Russia with them, and in the neighbouring regions of foreign countries.

Northwestern Federal District 

Republic of Karelia
 Russia
Arkhangelsk Oblast
Vologda Oblast
Leningrad Oblast
Murmansk Oblast
 Finland
 Kainuu
 Lapland
 North Karelia
 Northern Ostrobothnia
 South Karelia

Komi Republic
 Russia
Perm Krai
Arkhangelsk Oblast
Kirov Oblast
Sverdlovsk Oblast
Nenets Autonomous Okrug
Yamalo-Nenets Autonomous Okrug
Khanty-Mansi Autonomous Okrug

Arkhangelsk Oblast
 Russia
Republic of Karelia
Komi Republic
Vologda Oblast
Kirov Oblast
Yamalo-Nenets Autonomous Okrug

Vologda Oblast
 Russia
Republic of Karelia
Arkhangelsk Oblast
Kirov Oblast
Kostroma Oblast
Leningrad Oblast
Novgorod Oblast
Tver Oblast
Yaroslavl Oblast

Kaliningrad Oblast
 Lithuania
 Klaipeda County
 Marijampole County
 Taurage County
 Poland
Warmian-Masurian Voivodeship
Podlaskie Voivodeship
Pomeranian Voivodeship

Leningrad Oblast
 Russia
Republic of Karelia
Vologda Oblast
Novgorod Oblast
Pskov Oblast
Saint Petersburg
 Finland
 Kymenlaakso
 South Karelia
 Estonia
 Ida-Viru County

Murmansk Oblast
 Russia
Republic of Karelia
 Finland
 Lapland
 Norway
 Troms og Finnmark

Novgorod Oblast
 Russia
Vologda Oblast
Leningrad Oblast
Pskov Oblast
Tver Oblast

Pskov Oblast
 Russia
Leningrad Oblast
Novgorod Oblast
Tver Oblast
Smolensk Oblast
 Belarus
Vitebsk Region
 Latvia
 Alūksne Municipality
  Baltinava Municipality
 Viļaka Municipality
  Zilupe municipality
  Kārsava Municipality
  Ludza Municipality
 Cibla municipality
 Estonia
  Voru County
  Ida-Viru County
  Jogeva County
  Polva County
  Tartu County

Saint Petersburg
 Russia

Leningrad Oblast

Nenets Autonomous Okrug
 Russia
Komi Republic
Arkhangelsk Oblast
Yamalo-Nenets Autonomous Okrug

Volga Federal District 

Bashkortostan
 Russia
Tatarstan
Udmurtia
Perm Krai
Orenburg Oblast
Sverdlovsk Oblast
Chelyabinsk Oblast

Mari El
 Russia
Tatarstan
Chuvashia
Kirov Oblast
Nizhny Novgorod Oblast

Mordovia
 Russia
Chuvashia
Nizhny Novgorod Oblast
Penza Oblast
Ryazan Oblast
Ulyanovsk Oblast

Tatarstan
 Russia
Bashkortostan
Mari El
Udmurtia
Chuvashia
Kirov Oblast
Orenburg Oblast
Samara Oblast
Ulyanovsk Oblast

Udmurtia
 Russia
Bashkortostan
Tatarstan
Perm Krai
Kirov Oblast

Chuvashia
 Russia
Mari El
Mordovia
Tatarstan
Nizhny Novgorod Oblast
Ulyanovsk Oblast

Perm Krai
 Russia
Bashkortostan
Komi Republic
Udmurtia
Kirov Oblast
Sverdlovsk Oblast

Kirov Oblast
 Russia
Komi Republic
Mari El
Tatarstan
Udmurtia
Perm Krai
Arkhangelsk Oblast
Vologda Oblast
Nizhny Novgorod Oblast
Kostroma Oblast

Nizhny Novgorod Oblast
 Russia
Mari El
Mordovia
Chuvashia
Kostroma Oblast
Ivanovo Oblast
Vladimir Oblast
Kirov Oblast
Ryazan Oblast

Orenburg Oblast
 Russia
Bashkortostan
Tatarstan
Samara Oblast
Chelyabinsk Oblast
 Kazakhstan
Aktobe Province
West Kazakhstan Province
 Kostanay Province

Penza Oblast
 Russia
Mordovia
Ryazan Oblast
Saratov Oblast
Tambov Oblast
Ulyanovsk Oblast

Samara Oblast
 Russia
Tatarstan
Orenburg Oblast
Saratov Oblast
Ulyanovsk Oblast
 Kazakhstan
West Kazakhstan Province

Saratov Oblast
 Russia
Volgograd Oblast
Voronezh Oblast
Penza Oblast
Samara Oblast
Tambov Oblast
Ulyanovsk Oblast
 Kazakhstan
West Kazakhstan Province

Ulyanovsk Oblast
 Russia
Mordovia
Tatarstan
Chuvashia
Penza Oblast
Samara Oblast
Saratov Oblast

Southern Federal District 

Adygea
 Russia
Krasnodar Krai

Kalmykia
 Russia
Dagestan
Stavropol Krai
Astrakhan Oblast
Volgograd Oblast
Rostov Oblast

Krasnodar Krai
 Russia
 Adygea
 Karachay-Cherkessia
Stavropol Krai
Rostov Oblast
 Abkhazia
 Gagra District
Gudauta District
 Ukraine
 Crimea

Astrakhan Oblast
 Russia
Kalmykia
Volgograd Oblast
 Kazakhstan
West Kazakhstan Province
Atyrau Province

Volgograd Oblast
 Russia
Kalmykia
Astrakhan Oblast
Rostov Oblast
Saratov Oblast
Voronezh Oblast
 Kazakhstan
West Kazakhstan Province

Rostov Oblast
 Russia
Kalmykia
Stavropol Krai
Krasnodar Krai
Volgograd Oblast
Voronezh Oblast
 Ukraine
Donetsk Oblast
Luhansk Oblast

North Caucasian Federal District 

Dagestan
 Russia
Kalmykia
Chechnya
Stavropol Krai
 Azerbaijan
Balakan District
Qabala District
Zaqatala District
Qakh District
Qusar District
Oghuz District
Khachmaz District
Shaki District
Georgia
Kakheti

Ingushetia
 Russia
North Ossetia–Alania
Chechnya
Georgia
Mtskheta-Mtianeti

Kabardino-Balkaria
 Russia
North Ossetia–Alania
Stavropol Krai
 Karachay-Cherkessia
Georgia
Samegrelo-Zemo Svaneti
Racha-Lechkhumi and Kvemo Svaneti

Karachay-Cherkessia
 Russia
 Kabardino-Balkaria
Stavropol Krai
Krasnodar Krai
 Abkhazia
 Gulripshi District
Gudauta District
Sukhumi District
Georgia
Samegrelo-Zemo Svaneti

North Ossetia–Alania
 Russia
 Ingushetia
 Kabardino-Balkaria
Stavropol Krai
Chechnya
Georgia
Mtskheta-Mtianeti
Racha-Lechkhumi and Kvemo Svaneti
South Ossetia
Dzau district

Chechnya
 Russia
Dagestan
 Ingushetia
North Ossetia–Alania
Stavropol Krai
Georgia
Kakheti
Mtskheta-Mtianeti

Stavropol Krai
 Russia
Dagestan
 Kabardino-Balkaria
Kalmykia
 Karachay-Cherkessia
North Ossetia–Alania
Chechnya
Krasnodar Krai
Rostov Oblast

Ural Federal District 

Kurgan Oblast
 Russia
Sverdlovsk Oblast
Chelyabinsk Oblast
 Kazakhstan
North Kazakhstan Province
 Kostanay Province

Sverdlovsk Oblast
 Russia
Komi Republic
Bashkortostan
Perm Krai
Kurgan Oblast
Tyumen Oblast
Chelyabinsk Oblast
Khanty-Mansi Autonomous Okrug

Tyumen Oblast
 Russia
Komi Republic
Krasnoyarsk Krai
Kurgan Oblast
Omsk Oblast
Sverdlovsk Oblast
Tomsk Oblast
Nenets Autonomous Okrug
 Kazakhstan
North Kazakhstan Province

Chelyabinsk Oblast
 Russia
Bashkortostan
Kurgan Oblast
Orenburg Oblast
Sverdlovsk Oblast
 Kazakhstan
 Kostanay Province

Khanty-Mansi Autonomous Okrug
 Russia
Komi Republic
Krasnoyarsk Krai
Sverdlovsk Oblast
Tomsk Oblast
Tyumen Oblast
Yamalo-Nenets Autonomous Okrug

Yamalo-Nenets Autonomous Okrug
 Russia
Komi Republic
Krasnoyarsk Krai
Khanty-Mansi Autonomous Okrug
Nenets Autonomous Okrug

Siberian Federal District 

Altai Republic
 Russia
Tuva
Khakassia
Altai Krai
Kemerovo Oblast
 Kazakhstan
 East Kazakhstan Province
 China
Xinjiang
 Mongolia
 Bayan-Ölgii Province

Buryatia
 Russia
Tuva
Zabaykalsky Krai
Irkutsk Oblast
 Mongolia
 Bulgan Province
 Selenge Province
 Khövsgöl Province

Tuva
 Russia
Altai Republic
Buryatia
Khakassia
Irkutsk Oblast
Krasnoyarsk Krai
 Mongolia
 Bayan-Ölgii Province
 Khövsgöl Province
 Zavkhan Province
 Uvs Province

Khakassia
 Russia
Altai Republic
Tuva
Krasnoyarsk Krai
Kemerovo Oblast

Altai Krai
 Russia
Altai Republic
Kemerovo Oblast
Novosibirsk Oblast
 Kazakhstan
 East Kazakhstan Province
 Pavlodar Province

Zabaykalsky Krai
 Russia
Buryatia
Sakha Republic
Amur Oblast
Irkutsk Oblast
 Mongolia
 Dornod Province
 Selenge Province
 Khentii Province
 China
Inner Mongolia
Heilongjiang

Krasnoyarsk Krai
 Russia
Sakha Republic
Irkutsk Oblast
Kemerovo Oblast
Khakassia
Tuva
Khanty-Mansi Autonomous Okrug
Yamalo-Nenets Autonomous Okrug
Tomsk Oblast

Irkutsk Oblast
 Russia
Buryatia
Sakha Republic
Tuva
Krasnoyarsk Krai
Zabaykalsky Krai

Kemerovo Oblast
 Russia
Altai Republic
Khakassia
Altai Krai
Krasnoyarsk Krai
Novosibirsk Oblast
Tomsk Oblast

Novosibirsk Oblast
 Russia
Altai Krai
Kemerovo Oblast
Omsk Oblast
Tomsk Oblast
 Kazakhstan
 Pavlodar Province

Omsk Oblast
 Russia
Novosibirsk Oblast
Tomsk Oblast
Tyumen Oblast
 Kazakhstan
North Kazakhstan Province

Tomsk Oblast
 Russia
Krasnoyarsk Krai
Kemerovo Oblast
Novosibirsk Oblast
Omsk Oblast
Tyumen Oblast
Khanty-Mansi Autonomous Okrug

Far Eastern Federal District 

Sakha Republic
 Russia
Zabaykalsky Krai
Krasnoyarsk Krai
Khabarovsk Krai
Amur Oblast
Irkutsk Oblast
Magadan Oblast
Chukotka Autonomous Okrug

Kamchatka Krai
 Russia
Chukotka Autonomous Okrug
Magadan Oblast
Sakhalin Oblast
 US

Primorsky Krai
 Russia
Khabarovsk Krai
 China
Jilin
Heilongjiang
 North Korea
Rason

Amur Oblast
 Russia
Sakha Republic
Zabaykalsky Krai
Khabarovsk Krai
Jewish Autonomous Oblast
 China
Heilongjiang

Magadan Oblast
 Russia
Sakha Republic
Kamchatka Krai
Khabarovsk Krai
Chukotka Autonomous Okrug

Sakhalin Oblast
 Russia
Khabarovsk Krai
Kamchatka Krai
 Japan

Jewish Autonomous Oblast
 Russia
Khabarovsk Krai
Amur Oblast
 China
Heilongjiang

Chukotka Autonomous Okrug
 Russia
Sakha Republic
Kamchatka Krai
Magadan Oblast
 US

Crimea 
The status of the Crimea and of the city of Sevastopol is currently under dispute between Russia and Ukraine; Ukraine and the majority of the international community consider the Crimea to be an autonomous republic of Ukraine and Sevastopol to be one of Ukraine's cities with special status, while Russia, on the other hand, considers the Crimea to be a federal subject of Russia and Sevastopol to be one of Russia's three federal cities since the March 2014 annexation of Crimea by Russia.

In 2022, Russia declared the annexation of Ukraine's Donetsk, Kherson, Luhansk and Zaporizhzhia regions, which remains internationally unrecognized.

Republic of Crimea
 Russia
Sevastopol
 Ukraine
Kherson Oblast

Sevastopol
 Russia
Republic of Crimea

See also

Border Security Zone of Russia
Customs Code of Russia
Territorial disputes of the Russian Federation

Notes

References

External links
  Федеральное агентство по обустройству государственной границы Российской Федерации (Росграница)/ The Federal Agency for the Development of the State Border Facilities of the Russian Federation (Rosgranitsa) – official site of the government agency responsible for Russia's international borders